The Privatbrauerei Erdinger Weißbräu Werner Brombach GmbH (also known as Erdinger Weißbräu) is a brewery in Erding, Germany.  Its best-known products are its namesake Weißbiers (wheat beer).

History

Erdinger is the world's largest wheat beer brewery. It is widely available and popular across Germany and the European Union. Erdinger was founded in 1886 by Johann Kienle. Erdinger beer is the best-known culinary product of the town; however, the brewery did not receive its current name until 1949 from its owner Franz Brombach, who had acquired the brewery 14 years earlier.
The current owner is Franz Brombach's son, Werner Brombach (since 1975). Currently, there are ten varieties available:

 Weißbier: a golden cloudy beer (ABV 5.3%, white/cream label, pictured)
 Dunkel:  a dark brown type (ABV 5.6%, black label),(5.3% in export bottle)
 Kristallweizen (crystal clear): a filtered Weißbier (ABV 5.3%, silver label)
 Pikantus (picaanthus): a dark weizenbock beer (ABV 7.3%)
 Leicht (light): a light beer (ABVc 2.9%)
 Urweisse: A traditional wheat beer
 Schneeweiße (snow-white): a seasonal beer brewed from November to February (ABV 5.6%)
 Erdinger Champ: a wheat beer without yeast sediment in the bottle (ABV 4.7%)
 Alkoholfrei (alcohol free): an alcohol free version (ABV 0.4%, blue label)
 Festbier (festive beer) - a seasonal brew for Erding's Herbstfestes (autumn festival, also known as Volksfest)
Since 2015, Erdinger have been marketing their Alkoholfrei beer as a post activity sports drink.

See also
German beer
Hefeweizen
Helles
Doppelbock
 List of brewing companies in Germany

References

External links

 Erdinger Weißbräu website in German
 Erdinger Weißbräu website in English

Beer and breweries in Bavaria
Breweries in Germany
Beer brands of Germany
Companies based in Bavaria